Brian Flaherty (born 3 March 1991) is an Irish hurler who currently plays as a substitute right wing-back for the Galway senior team.

Flaherty joined the team during the 2012 championship, but has remained on the fringe of the panel.  An All-Ireland medalist in the minor grade, Flannery has won one Leinster medal in the senior grade as a non-playing substitute.

At club level Flaherty plays with the Abbeyknockmoy club.

References

1991 births
Living people
Abbeyknockmoy hurlers
Galway inter-county hurlers
Connacht inter-provincial hurlers
DCU hurlers